Benjamin Earl Garry (February 11, 1956 – June 24, 2006) was an American football running back who played two seasons with the Baltimore Colts of the National Football League (NFL). He was drafted by the Baltimore Colts in the sixth round of the 1978 NFL Draft. He played college football at Southern Mississippi University and attended Pascagoula High School in Pascagoula, Mississippi.

References

External links
Just Sports Stats

1956 births
2006 deaths
Players of American football from Mississippi
American football running backs
African-American players of American football
Southern Miss Golden Eagles football players
Baltimore Colts players
People from Hazlehurst, Mississippi
20th-century African-American sportspeople
21st-century African-American people